Frederick Burbidge may refer to:

 Frederick William Burbidge (1847–1905), British explorer 
 Frederick Burbidge (cricketer) (1832–1892), English cricketer